Emich Carl, Prince of Leiningen (27 September 1763 – 4 July 1814) was a German nobleman. He is an ancestor of various European royals, including Carl XVI Gustaf of Sweden, Felipe VI of Spain, and Constantine II of Greece. After his death, his widow, Princess Victoria of Saxe-Coburg-Saalfeld, married a son of George III of the United Kingdom and became the mother of Victoria, Queen of the United Kingdom.

Biography

Background
Emich Carl was born at Dürckheim, the fourth child and only son of Carl Friedrich Wilhelm, Count of Leiningen-Dagsburg-Hartenburg and his wife Countess Christiane Wilhelmine Luise of Solms-Rödelheim und Assenheim (1736–1803). On 3 July 1779, his father was made a Prince of the Holy Roman Empire, and Emich Carl became Hereditary Prince of Leiningen. On 9 January 1807, he succeeded his father as second Prince of Leiningen.

Marriages and issue
Emich Carl was married firstly, on 4 July 1787, to Countess Henriette Sophie of Reuss-Ebersdorf (1767-1801), youngest daughter of Heinrich XXIV, Count of Reuss-Ebersdorf and his wife, Countess Karoline Ernestine of Erbach-Schönberg. Henriette died on 3 September 1801. Emich Carl and Henrietta had one son, who died young and within the lifetime of his mother, being:
Prince Friedrich Karl Heinrich Ludwig of Leiningen (1 March 1793 – 22 February 1800)

On 21 December 1803, two years after the death of his first wife, Emich married Princess Victoria of Saxe-Coburg-Saalfeld, fourth daughter of Francis, Duke of Saxe-Coburg-Saalfeld by his wife, Countess Augusta Reuss of Ebersdorf. His second wife was a niece of his late wife. They had two further children:
Carl Friedrich Wilhelm Emich (12 September 1804 – 13 November 1856); succeeded his father as third prince; married on 13 February 1829, Countess Maria von Klebelsberg zu Thumburg, and had issue.
Princess Anna Feodora Auguste Charlotte Wilhelmine of Leiningen (7 December 1807 – 23 September 1872); married in 1828, Ernst I, Prince of Hohenlohe-Langenburg, and had issue. She is an ancestor of various European royals, including Carl XVI Gustaf of Sweden, Felipe VI of Spain, and Constantine II of Greece.

Death and succession
Emich Carl died at Amorbach on 4 July 1814, and was succeeded by their only surviving son, Carl Friedrich.

Post-mortem connections
Four years after his death, his widow married Edward, Duke of Kent and Strathearn, fourth son of King George III of the United Kingdom. They had a daughter, Princess Victoria of Kent, who would later become Queen regnant of the United Kingdom.

Ancestry

Sources
 Thomas Gehrlein: Das Haus Leiningen. 900 Jahre Gesamtgeschichte mit Stammfolgen. Deutsche Fürstenhäuser. Heft 32. Börde Verlag, Werl 2011, S. 25

1763 births
1814 deaths
People from Bad Dürkheim
Emich Carl, 2nd Prince of Leiningen
Emich Carl
Emich Carl, 2nd Prince of Leiningen